Clayton Hotel Limerick  (formerly the Clarion Hotel) is a 17-storey hotel located beside the River Shannon on Steamboat Quay in Limerick. Part of the Dalata Hotel Group, the hotel was built in 2002 at a cost of €20 Million.

Facilities
The Clayton Hotel in Limerick City is a 4 star hotel and is currently Ireland's tallest hotel. It rises 187 ft above Limerick making it the 2nd tallest building in Limerick after Riverpoint and the 13th tallest storied building on the island of Ireland. The hotel has 158 riverside rooms, 3 suites and a penthouse. The penthouse, situated on the highest living floor, has views of the city. The hotel also has a gym, a 12-metre pool, sauna, steam room and a restaurant.

See also
 Riverpoint
 List of tallest buildings in Ireland

References

Skyscrapers in the Republic of Ireland
Hotels in County Limerick
Buildings and structures in Limerick (city)
Hotels established in 2002
Hotel buildings completed in 2002
Skyscraper hotels
21st-century architecture in the Republic of Ireland